Euagra perpasta is a moth of the subfamily Arctiinae. It was described by Max Wilhelm Karl Draudt in 1917. It is found in Colombia.

References

 

Arctiinae
Moths described in 1917